Zetix is a fabric invented by Auxetics Technologies, Ltd., a UK company. It is marketed in North America under the trade name Xtegra by Advanced Fabric Technologies of Houston, Texas.

Zetix is an auxetic material designed to be strong enough to absorb and disperse shockwaves from explosions without breaking. Zetix combines the very expensive high-performance materials with cheaper bulk components in a 1-to-100 ratio while maintaining the blast-resistant properties of the high-performance materials.

Usage 
Zetix is used in a variety of products including body armor, seat belts, window covering, dental floss, military tents, improved hurricane and blast protection for petrochemical plants and offshore platforms, self-adjusting filtration systems, remotely adjustable tourniquets and bandages, and medical sutures that will not damage body tissue. It also has some applications in composite materials. It is used in water activated tape, also referred to as gummed paper tape, a popular form of carton sealing, under the trading name name Xtegra™ Tegrabond™.

Zetix is also used in threads and ropes. Knots under tension may be more secure because auxetic material expands when stretched. It is known as Xtegra™ Auxetic Yarn with Kevlar®, outside of the United Kingdom.

References

External links 
 Zetix manufacturer Auxetix
 Advanced Fabric Technologies, LLC

Brand name materials